Pachyrhinus lethierryi is a species of beetle from the genus Pachyrhinus.

References

Entiminae
Beetles described in 1875